For the Kunbi community in Maharashtra, see Kunbi
 For the Kunbi community in Goa, see Gauda and Kunbi
 For the Kunbi community in Kerala, see Kudumbi
 For the Kanbi community in Gujarat, see Patidar